Godavari is a 2021 Indian Marathi-language drama film directed by Nikhil Mahajan and produced by Jitendra Joshi, Mitali Joshi, Pavan Malu and Nikhil Mahajan under the banner of Blue Drop Films. Starring Neena Kulkarni, Jitendra Joshi and Vikram Gokhale, the film tells a story of a family living on the banks of river Godavari in Nashik. It had its world premiere at 2021 Vancouver International Film Festival on 4 October 2021, and scheduled to release in theatres in India on 3 December 2021.

Cast
Neena Kulkarni as Nishikant's mother
Jitendra Joshi as Nishikant Deshmukh
Sanjay Mone as Nishikant's father
Vikram Gokhale as Nishikant's grandfather
Gauri Nalawade as Gautami, Nishikant's wife
Saniya Bhandare as Sarita, Nishikant's daughter
Priyadarshan Jadhav as Keshav
Ameet Dograa 
Pavan Malu 
Sakhi Gokhale
Mohit Takalkar as The Balloon Man

Release
Godavari was intitially slated to release on May 1, 2021, commemorating  Maharashtra Day, but was postponed due to COVID-19 pandemic. It was invited at 2021 Vancouver International Film Festival in 'Contemporary World Cinema' section of festival program. It had its world premiere on 4 October 2021, and its theatrical release in India was scheduled on 3 December 2021.

The film was also invited at the New Zealand International Film Festival for its Wellington edition to be screened on 10 November 2021, and at 52nd International Film Festival of India in the film category of 'Indian Panorama' section for screening in November. It was also selected for Golden Peacock Awards category. Later in March 2022, it was screened at Pune International Film Festival, where it won Best Director award, Best Cinematography award and Best Music Special Jury Prize. The film was also selected as opening film at 22nd edition of New York Indian Film Festival screened on 7 May 2022. The film was also screened at Cannes Film Festival in Marché du Film held along 2022 edition of the festival on 19 May at Palais des Festivals. It was released theatrically on 11 November 2022 after delays.

Reception
Charlie Smith of The Georgia Straight reviewing the film at VIFF praised the music saying "Indian songs, amplify the misery of Nishikant’s existence", and cinematography, writing, "Imaginative camera work also does its magic." Smith also appreciated the performances of cast and said, "The acting in Godavari is first-rate". He praised the acting of Jitendra Joshi for his portrayal of "fiery-eyed the troubled Nishikant", Priyadarshan Jadhav for his "pensive and plaintive performance", and Neena Kulkarni for her "subtle and authentic acting". He concluded, "This is Marathi arthouse cinema at its best."

Awards and nominations

References

External links
 

2021 films
2020s Marathi-language films
Films postponed due to the COVID-19 pandemic
Indian drama films
Films shot in Maharashtra
Films set on rivers